Saratovsky (masculine), Saratovskaya (feminine), or Saratovskoye (neuter) may refer to:
Saratovsky District, a district of Saratov Oblast, Russia
Saratovsky (rural locality) (Saratovskaya, Saratovskoye), several rural localities in Russia
Saratov Oblast (Saratovskaya oblast), a federal subject of Russia
Saratovskoye, former name of Qyzylqayyng, a populated place in Kazakhstan